The Ministry of Justice in the Government of Montenegro (Montenegrin: Ministarstvo Pravde u Vladi Crne Gore / Министарство Праве у Влади Црне Горе, MPVCG) is the ministry in the Government of Montenegro which is in charge of the nation's justice system and human and minority rights.

Ministers of Justice, since 1991

External links
Official Website

Justice
Montenegro
Ministries established in 2006
2006 establishments in Montenegro